Tales of the Slayer are volumes containing prose short stories. Four volumes of this series have been released, all published by Pocket Books. Each contains a number of short stories surrounding the mythology of past Slayers.

Tales within Buffyverse chronology
These are ordered by chronology rather than by their appearance in the books.

A Good Run
Author: Greg Rucka
Collected in: Vol. I
Setting: Greece, 490 BC

It's 490 BC in Greece and Thessily is the current Slayer. In order to protect an important messenger, she must run 300 miles in 3 days while fending off countless vampires. In the end, this 29-year-old Slayer just wants to be remembered for something great that she herself did.

Lady Shobu
Author: Kara Dalkey
Collected in: Vol. II
Setting: Sagami Province, Japan, 980

Kishi Minomoto is a brave girl born into a warrior clan who is suddenly called to serve as a lady in waiting for the Great Lady Ankimon-in. Her summoner, Bennin, claims to be her Watcher and informs her of her duty as a Slayer. He teaches her precious information concerning the demons around her as well as her predecessor before sending her to wait on the Great Lady. Kishi does her best to locate the demons which have been surrounding the Palace only to find out that Bennin is not who he says he is; nor is the Great Lady who was originally the Watcher of the past Slayer. Bennin, is actually Migoto, Bennin's brother, who has been sacrificing Slayers to a dragon in order to maintain his immortal life.

Dark of the Moon
Author: Yvonne Navarro
Collected in: Vol. III
Setting: 1229 and 1250

The story of a Slayer who was trained but did not know what her calling was. Her angst and frustration come through when she failed to fulfill her duty through no fault of her own.

Abomination
Author: Laura J. Burns and Melinda Metz
Collected in: Vol. II
Setting: Beauport, Brittany, France, 1320

Eliane and her Watcher have spent years training together, but as the years go by and Eliane becomes older they begin to suspect that she will never be called as a Slayer. Eventually she and her Watcher fall in love, get married and form a family. When she finally reaches the age of 20, she is abruptly called to her duty and her husband is taken away from her for violating codes of conduct with his charge. Eliane refuses to accept her duty until her husband has returned to her even though Tatoul, a particularly vicious vampire plagues her city. When the demon finally steals her five-year-old child and turns him into a vampire, she begins to fight back. At the end, she allows her son to drink her blood, slaying him at the same time. Because they are connected when this happens, the son is slayed but then she herself starts to light on fire. At the end the only thing left remaining is her daughter, who is called to be the next Slayer, even though an infant. She is given to her father.

The Rule of Silence
Author: Kara Dalkey
Collected in: Vol. IV
Setting: Seville, Spain, 1481

The Slayer, Esperanza de la Vega, is a Marrano and this makes her a heretic. Reading about demons does not help her standing at all.

The White Doe
Author: Christie Golden
Collected in: Vol. I
Setting: London, 1586

A Slayer named White Doe was adopted by Croatoans despite her English breeding and trained as the men were. She grew to be beautiful and agile. A particular wizard of the people fell in love with her but she did not return his lust. He then turned her into a white doe because if he could not have her then he did not wish anyone else have her heart. But Seal of the Ocean loves her and eventually finds her, only to end up killing her because he believes she is a wild animal. This story is based on myths built around the real life disappearance of the Roanoke Colony and Virginia Dare, the first child of English colonists born on American soil.

Die Blutgrafin
Author: Yvonne Navarro
Collected in: Vol. I
Setting: Hungary, 1609

Countesse Elizabeth Bathory (die Blutgrafin) aka the Blood Countess is a wicked woman that lives in a castle in Hungary. It is rumoured that she bathes in the blood of young virgins in order to stay youthful. Ildikó is the current Slayer, who lives isolated with her Watcher. He trains her in the ways of a lady and she successfully infiltrates the castle, in an effort to stop the deaths that are seemingly always occurring there. Though she finds out how she kills the girls, she is eventually drugged and killed by Elizabeth Bathory, never finding out if she was a vampire or not.

Blood and Brine
Author: Greg Cox
Collected in: Vol. II
Setting: The Caribbean 1661

Robin Whitby is the captain of a schooner titled Neptune's Lady. She has been passing herself off as a man in order to be accepted by her crew. While sailing the seas, they come about a boat called the El Dorado which is strangely free of any crew members, save for a young Spanish girl. The boat is loaded with gold and treasures and in particular, an ugly little idol. After a brief mutiny on board her ship as soon as the crew realizes that she's female, half the members take the other boat and set off. However, the boat becomes plagued by the kraken, a water monster with fangs and squid-like arms, and Robin heads back to fight for the crew that once betrayed her. In a fight with the kraken, Robin loses her right forearm to the beast, losing a part of herself, yet still not defeating the hideous monster.

Unholy Madness
Author: Nancy Holder
Collected in: Vol. I
Setting: France, 1789

Marie-Christina is a Slayer of royal blood who lives in Marie-Antoinette's royal palace at Versailles. Unfortunately, the royals have become displeased with her work, as has her Watcher. Originally Marie despises the poor of France, an attitude shared by her Watcher and most of the court. Her attitude slowly changes upon meeting a young, innocent girl who lives on the street. Marie tries to confront L'Hero, a vampire who is causing rebellion among the poor. They know he is a vampire but do not care, as the situation he creates for them is better than what the royals ever did for them. Marie's life falls apart as the rebellion erupts around her. At the end, she herself finds out she was born a peasant, and her watcher doesn't care. As he is about to be guillotined, he says to her, "Once a peasant...." The story ends with the little girl grabbing Marie-Christina's hand, and having her hand feel like ice, probably a result of being turned into a vampire herself.

The Ghosts of Slayers Past
Author: Scott Allie
Collected in: Vol. II
Setting: England, 1843

The current Watcher of the current Slayer (who is from the run down east end of London) has absolutely no sympathy for his charge until he is visited by two Slayers from the past who show him what he is doing wrong, but it isn't until one Slayer from the future makes an appearance that the Watcher learns the error of his ways.

Ch'ing Shih
Author: Mel Odom
Collected in: Vol. III
Setting: June 10, 1856

After the Slayer's Watcher died, she ran away from the monastery where he trained her. Posing as a man she survived on her own in the city. When her new Watcher finds her they join forces to battle an extremely dangerous vampire.

The New Watcher
Author: Kristine Kathryn Rusch
Collected in: Vol. II
Setting: Atlanta, 1864

Pauline Francis Bernard is passing herself off as a man under the name of Frankie Massey in order to enlist in the Union army. Her Watcher is long dead and a new Watcher arrives in her division in search of a woman. Her general has secretly known that Frankie is in fact a female, but wants her on his side. He devises a plan to exterminate the vampires plaguing the war-torn South, and allows the Watcher and Frankie to go their own way.

Alone
Author: Scott Allie
Collected in: Vol. IV
Setting: 1876 Ireland

Around the time of her Cruciamentum, the Slayer, Catherine Callan of Ulster, must tolerate both her father and prejudice from the largely English Watchers Council. She teases the council, pretending to be married to Mr. Spelling, her Watcher.

Mornglom Dreaming
Author: Doranna Durgin
Collected in: Vol. I
Setting: Kentucky, 1886

Mollie Prater is a simple 15-year-old girl living in Kentucky in 1886. Next week she's to be married to Harly. Around this time, a Watcher named Ethan arrives in search for her, as she is the new Slayer. Many people in her town have been attacked by demons and she's the only one that's faced them and lived to tell the tale. Mollie's wedding day is interrupted by these demons and Ethan's appearance. He briefly tells her that she is the Slayer and she kills the demons. But after Mollie slays the demons attacking her wedding, Harly walks out on her and she knows her life won't ever be the same.

House of the Vampire
Author: Michael Reaves
Collected in: Vol. II
Setting: London 1897

Dracula has come to England, even after his supposed death many years ago. Angelique Hawthorne, the current Slayer, must determine if she's under the thrall of Dracula herself and how to defeat him. She also learns a hard lesson about keeping friends in her field.

Sideshow Slayer
Author: Greg Cox
Collected in: Vol. IV
Setting: Duluth, Minnesota, 1911

The Slayer, Millicent "Millie" Rose Gresham is approaching her eighteenth birthday and therefore the Cruciamentum awaits. Millie is a travelling Slayer, covering within a carnival side show. The plans go wrong, leading to death and destruction.

Survivors
Author: Kristine Kathryn Rusch
Collected in: Vol. IV
Setting: Chicago 1919

The Slayer, Dorothy "Dot" Singers is approaching her eighteenth birthday and therefore the Cruciamentum awaits her. Her Watcher, Reginald Hill, is suffering from a very severe mental illness.

The War Between the States
Author: Rebecca Rand Kirshner
Collected in: Vol. II
Setting: New York, 1922

A young woman named Sally Jean comes to New York and becomes awed by a flapper named Ardita O'Reilly who is in fact the current Slayer. Sally Jean becomes completely enthralled by everything that Ardita possesses, until she learns what exactly Ardita is and what she does.

Silent Screams
Author: Mel Odom
Collected in: Vol. I
Setting: Germany, 1923

Herr Lichtermann is the Watcher of the new official Slayer, Britta. He trains her but never once encounters a vampire or demon. One night, the Slayer and Watcher attend a screening of a new movie, only to find out that the creators are vampires who plan to kill their audience. Herr Lichtermann runs away, leaving Britta to die alone, breaking his promise to her. But Lichtermann is captured and put into a cell with the newly vamped Britta who wants nothing more than to kill the Watcher that betrayed her.

Voodoo Lounge
Author: Christopher Golden
Collected in: Vol. III
Setting: December 12, 1940

Sequel to Spike and Dru: Pretty Maids All in a Row. The Slayer and her Watcher try to find a Watcher who has gone missing in 1940's United States.

Stakeout on Rush Street
Author: Max Allan Collins with Matthew V. Clemens
Collected in: Vol. II
Setting: Chicago, Illinois, 1943

The current Slayer is a private eye who goes by the name Betty. She has ties to the mob currently in Chicago and has helped them out on several occasions. When she learns that one of their current employees is in fact a vampire, she informs the mob boss who agrees to pay her a large sum of money in exchange for her killing the vampire.

Undeadsville
Author: Michael Reaves
Collected in: Vol. IV
Setting: New York, 1952

The Slayer is a 'beatnik' named Zoe, is turning eighteen, and therefore would soon be having her Cruciamentum. Zoe's Watcher, Ian Sykes, is so alienated from her lifestyle that he conspires to see that his Slayer does not survive her Cruciamentum.

And White Splits the Night
Author: Yvonne Navarro
Collected in: Vol. I
Setting: Florida, 1956

17 year old Asha is a dark-skinned Slayer in an extremely racist society. While hunting, she discovers a vampire's plan to kill a church group in a couple of days and bomb the place to the ground. She and her Watcher rush to the church to prevent the attack from happening. Asha manages to save the people in the church but ends up being killed herself.

Back to the Garden
Author: Robert Joseph Levy
Collected in: Vol. IV
Setting: 1969

A pacifist Slayer, Beryl MacKenzie, approaches her eighteenth birthday and therefore her Cruciamentum awaits her. She joins a commune in Nova Scotia in just before coming into her power. So she must face the Cruciamentum as an initiation into being a Slayer.

It's All About the Mission
Author: Nancy Holder
Collected in: Vol. IV
Setting: Harlem, New York, 1973

Nikki Wood is turning eighteen and pregnant. Nikki's Watcher, Bernard Crowley, knows that her Cruciamentum is a very terrible idea.

Two Teenage Girls at the Mall
Author: Jane Espenson
Collected in: Vol. IV
Setting: Keller, Nebraska, 1981

This story is told from the perspective of a sixteen-year-old newly turned vampire, Julie Lemmer. Her sire starves her then locks her in a mall. The second girl locked in the mall is a Slayer who has just turned eighteen and is therefore facing her Cruciamentum. Unfortunately Julie has unexpected advantages over the Slayer.

The Code of the Samurai
Author: Nancy Holder
Collected in: Vol. III
Setting: Tokyo, 1993

India Cohen, Buffy's immediate predecessor, patrols freely around Tokyo. She fancies her handsome, young watcher, Kit. The pair are asked to help a clan dust their vampire-ancestor, along with 50 other warriors. India Cohen also appears in The Book of Fours.

Again, Sunnydale
Author: Jane Espenson
Collected in: Vol. II
Setting: California, 2001 with flashbacks to 1999

Buffy, Willow and Xander are sent back into their 1999 bodies back in high school. They have all the knowledge of what is to come because they are actually from the year 2001. Willow and Xander are both disturbed and want to go back to the present time but Buffy is determined to stay in the past where her mother still lives and her life isn't nearly as complicated as it had become in the future.

All That You Do Comes Back Unto Thee
Author: Todd A. McIntosh
Collected in: Vol. II
Setting: California, 2000

A fellow student of Buffy Summers at UC Sunnydale named Josh decides to stand up for himself against the mean jocks and summons an ancient Egyptian spirit to do his bidding. Only the spirit doesn't want to play along and is in search of his mummified body which is currently located in Sunnydale's museum. It's up to Buffy to stop this spirit from inhabiting his old body, but it turns out that Xander, despite his mummy fears, saves the day.

Continuity

Canonical issues

Buffy novels are not usually considered to be canonical. However, overviews summarising their story, written early in the writing process, were 'approved' by both Fox and Joss Whedon (or his office), and the books were therefore later published as official Buffy merchandise.

The one major departure from the canon was started in Christopher Golden's Spike and Dru: Pretty Maids All in a Row and then continued in his story Voodoo Lounge from vol. III. This story centres around the fact that Spike kills the Slayer Sophie Carstensen, and the remaining narrative details the death of her immediate successor, Isabel Cortes, then the adventures of the next girl, Eleanor Boudreau. However, in the canon of the TV show, a large point is made of the fact that the two Slayers that Spike is able to kill are Xin Rong and Nikki Wood, Robin Wood's mother.

External links
Litefoot1969.bravepages.com - Review of Volume 1
Litefoot1969.bravepages.com - Review of Volume 2
Litefoot1969.bravepages.com - Review of Volume 3

Series of books
Books based on Buffy the Vampire Slayer
Buffyverse
Horror anthologies
Fantasy anthologies